Robert Schörgenhofer (born 12 February 1973 in Vorarlberg) is an Austrian football referee. He refereed at the 2012–13 UEFA Europa League.

Schörgenhofer became a FIFA referee in 2007. He has officiated at the 2011 FIFA U-20 World Cup and qualifying matches for the 2010, 2014 and 2018 World Cups.

References 

1973 births
People from Dornbirn
Living people
Austrian football referees
UEFA Europa League referees
Sportspeople from Vorarlberg